Virginia's 79th House of Delegates district is one of 100 seats in the Virginia House of Delegates, the lower house of the state's bicameral legislature. District 79 represents parts of the cities of Norfolk and Portsmouth. The seat is currently held by Nadarius Clark, who defeated incumbent Steve Heretick in the 2021 Democratic primary and Republican Lawrence Mason in the general election.

District officeholders

References

Norfolk, Virginia
Portsmouth, Virginia
Virginia House of Delegates districts